Waldo may refer to:

People and fictional characters 
 Waldo (given name), a list of people and fictional characters
 Waldo (surname), a list of people
 Waldo (footballer), Brazilian footballer Waldo Machado da Silva (1934–2019)
 Waldo (musician), Finnish eurodance musician Marko Reijonen (born 1967)

Places

Canada
 Waldo, British Columbia, a ghost town

United States

Communities

 Waldo, Alabama, a town
 Waldo, Arkansas, a city
 Waldo, former name of Sausalito, California, a city
 Waldo Junction, California, formerly Waldo, an unincorporated community
 Waldo, Florida, a city
 Waldo Historic District, Waldo, Florida
 Waldo, Kansas, a small town
 Waldo Township, Russell County, Kansas, the surrounding township
 Waldo, Kansas City, Missouri, a city neighborhood
 Waldo, Magoffin County, Kentucky
 Waldo County, Maine
 Waldo, Maine, a town
 Waldo, Missouri, an unincorporated community
 Waldo, New Mexico, an unincorporated area
 Waldo, Ohio, a village
 Waldo Township, Marion County, Ohio, the surrounding township
 Waldo, Oregon, a ghost town
 Waldo, Wisconsin, a village

Other places
 Mount Waldo, a mountain in Maine
 Waldo Hills, a range of hills in Oregon
 Waldo Lake, a freshwater lake in Oregon
 Waldo Mountain, a summit in Oregon
 Waldo Park, a municipal park in Salem, Oregon
 WALDO (Work And Live District Overlay), a newer name for the Powerhouse Arts District, Jersey City, New Jersey

Arts and entertainment 
 Waldo (novel), a 1967 novel by Paul Theroux
 "Waldo" (short story), by Robert A. Heinlein

Other uses 
 Tropical Storm Waldo (disambiguation)
 Waldo (Amtrak station), a former train station in Waldo, Florida
 Waldo Block, Portland, Oregon, a commercial building on the National Register of Historic Places
 Waldo Tunnel, a tunnel just north of the Golden Gate Bridge into Sausalito, California
 Waldo Stadium, the football stadium at Western Michigan University
 Waldo Theatre, Waldoboro, Maine, on the National Register of Historic Places
 Waldo (bivalve), a genus of mollusc
 Waldo, a name for a remote manipulator, inspired by the short story

See also
 Waldo Water Tower (disambiguation)
 
 Walto (disambiguation)